Sara Kadefors (born September 19, 1965) is a Swedish writer and film director.

She was born in Gothenburg and grew up in Landvetter. From 1989 to 1996, she was host for a number of popular radio and television programs. Her second novel Sandor Slash Ida, published in the same year, was awarded the August Prize and became the best-selling Swedish young adult novel of all time. Kadefors has also written a number of novels for adults, including Fågelbovägen 32.

Kadefors wrote the script for Allt du önskar, Sveriges Radio's Christmas Calendar for 2011.

Selected films 
 Fröken Sverige (2004), wrote script
 Orka! Orka! (2004), wrote script
 Oh Shit!, short (2005), wrote script & directed
 Sandor slash Ida (2005), wrote script
 Sluta stöna eller dö (2007), wrote script & directed

References

External links 
 

1965 births
Living people
Swedish women children's writers
Swedish children's writers
Swedish women novelists
Swedish film directors
Swedish screenwriters
Swedish women screenwriters
Swedish women film directors